The Academy of Creative Education (ACE) is a nationally recognized, non-traditional, non-punitive model high school for students at risk of dropping out in the North East Independent School District in San Antonio, Texas.

History 
ACE was established with seed money from the Texas Education Agency (TEA) and the Education Economic Policy Center (EEPC) and began its first classes for at-risk youth on September 16, 1991. Using a non-traditional approach to education, ACE is the collaborative result of a design team composed of educators and community representatives.

The design team envisioned a campus where at-risk youth ages 16–21 would have a totally different environment in which to learn and where the instructors would use innovative teaching models and teaching strategies. This creative approach would improve student achievement by changing the ways in which students were taught.

Today, the project is funded by local funds, compensatory education funds, career and technology funds, special education support, and community resources. Through strong leadership, former dropouts are empowered to become tomorrow's problem solvers, thinkers and leaders.

Mission statement 
"The North East Academy of Creative Education is a new American School providing diverse educational opportunities in a way that empowers students to become tomorrow's thinkers, problem solvers, and leaders, making The Academy an educational beacon for the 21st century. The Academy of Creative Education . . . Lighting the Way!"

Academics

Curriculum 
North East Independent School District policy and the Texas Education Code require
that students participate actively in a balanced curriculum designed to meet individual
needs. The Academy’s curriculum goal is to prepare well-rounded, thoughtful, and
active citizens who understand the importance of patriotism and can function
productively in a free enterprise society with appreciation for the basic democratic
values of our state and national heritage.

The driving force behind the Academy’s non-traditional program is the curriculum, for
which Academy educators continually use research-based information to determine
what at-risk youth need to learn. The curriculum designed by the faculty is self-paced,
accelerated, and individualized. It provides students with academic choices that promote
critical thinking skills and problem-solving techniques that apply to real-life experiences.
Challenging and motivating activities are incorporated to integrate core subjects within
and across the curriculum. Interdisciplinary concepts are included throughout the
curriculum to emphasize the Texas Assessment of Knowledge and Skills (TAKS) objectives.
To ensure that all students are successful learners, Academy educators have centered
the integrated, in-depth curriculum around student learning styles. Curriculum is based
on innovative approaches that are uniquely suited to meet the needs, abilities, interests,
and backgrounds of the students. The curriculum features performance-based activities
while addressing how each student learns best. All students are treated as though they
are gifted and are expected to achieve 80% mastery on all assignments.

External links 
 Campus Details - NEISD.NET
 

High schools in San Antonio
Public high schools in Texas